Dallas International School Mission Laïque Française (DIS) is an elementary, middle, and high school in the North Dallas area in Dallas, Texas, United States, and is the only international private school in Dallas. It is an English-French school and uses the French educational system. It is a part of the Mission Laïque Française network. Dallas International School is accredited by the Independent Schools Association of the Southwest (ISAS). In 2016, DIS was ranked by the Washington Post as #24 in the nation for "America's Most Challenging High Schools.

Curriculum
In preschool through kindergarten, 50% of the education is in French, 40% in English and 10% in Spanish. In elementary school grades, about 70% of instruction is in French and 30% in English. In addition, students have one hour of Spanish instruction per week. In middle school grades, all subjects are taught in French. English education occurs 3 to 5 hours per week. A student may take either Mandarin Chinese, German or Spanish for three hours per week. In high school, a student may stay in a French language education track, or may take an English language International Baccalaureate track.

Location
Dallas International School has two campuses located in North Dallas. The lower school campus (pre-k 2 to fourth grade) is referred to as the Churchill campus and is located at 6039 Churchill Way, Dallas, Texas 75230. The upper school campus (5th grade to 12th grade) is referred to as the Waterview campus and is located at 17811 Waterview Parkway, Dallas, Texas 75252.

See also
 Education in Dallas
 Agency for French Education Abroad
 Education in France
 International school
 List of international schools
 Mission laïque française
 Multilingualism

References

External links
 
 

Independent Schools Association of the Southwest
Private K-12 schools in Dallas
French international schools in the United States
International schools in Texas
Bilingual schools in Texas
Educational institutions established in 1984
1984 establishments in Texas
AEFE contracted schools
Mission laïque française